Pogost Ilyinsky is a rural locality (a selo) in Kadnikov, Sokolsky District, Vologda Oblast, Russia. The population was 3 as of 2002.

Geography 
The distance to Sokol is 16 km, to Kadnikov is 3 km. Tenkovo is the nearest rural locality.

References 

Rural localities in Sokolsky District, Vologda Oblast